"Fart Proudly" (also called "A Letter to a Royal Academy about farting", and "To the Royal Academy of Farting") is the popular name of an essay about flatulence written by Benjamin Franklin   1781 while he was living abroad as United States Ambassador to France. It is an example of flatulence humor.

Description
"A Letter to a Royal Academy" was composed in response to a call for scientific papers from the Royal Academy of Brussels. Franklin believed that the various academic societies in Europe were increasingly pretentious and concerned with the impractical. Revealing his "bawdy, scurrilous side," Franklin responded with an essay suggesting that research and practical reasoning be undertaken into methods of improving the odor of human flatulence.

The essay was never submitted but was sent as a letter to Richard Price, a Welsh philosopher and Unitarian minister in England with whom Franklin had an ongoing correspondence. The text of the essay's introduction reads in part:

The essay goes on to discuss the way different foods affect the odor of flatulence and to propose scientific testing of farting. Franklin also suggests that scientists work to develop a drug, "wholesome and not disagreeable", which can be mixed with "common Food or Sauces" with the effect of rendering flatulence "not only inoffensive, but agreeable as Perfumes". The essay ends with a pun saying that compared to the practical applications of this discussion, other sciences are "scarcely worth a FART-HING."
 
Copies of the essay were privately printed by Franklin at his printing press in Passy. Franklin distributed the essay to friends, including Joseph Priestley (a chemist famous for his work on gases). After Franklin's death, the essay was long excluded from published collections of Franklin's writing, but it is available online.

In 2021, the Young Academy of Belgium, a successor to the Royal Academy of Belgium, issued a reply to Franklin's letter as part of MEL Magazine's 240th anniversary celebration of the letter.

See also 
 "Advice to a Friend on Choosing a Mistress"
 Flatulence humor

References

External links 
 Text of the essay
 

1781 documents
1781 essays
Flatulence humor
Works by Benjamin Franklin